Delta Phi is a fraternity founded in 1827 at Union College in Schenectady, New York consisting of ten active chapters along the East Coast of the United States. The fraternity also uses the names "St. Elmo," "St. Elmo Hall," or merely "Elmo" because of its relation to Erasmus of Formia with some chapters known almost exclusively by one of these names on their respective campuses. Delta Phi was, after the Kappa Alpha Society and Sigma Phi Society, the third and last member of the Union Triad.

History
Delta Phi was officially founded on November 17, 1827 at Union College by nine upperclassmen. Delta Phi and the other Union Triad fraternities were established during a time of strong Anti-Masonry sentiment in the United States and became targets of the Anti-Masonry movement. This led Phi Beta Kappa, the original fraternity, to abandon secrecy and become a strictly honor society.

In the early 1830s, Dr. Eliphalet Nott, president of Union College, called for the dissolution of all fraternities. Before this policy could be enacted, John Jay Hyde, a member of Delta Phi, argued the benefits of the fraternity system so convincingly that Dr. Nott relented and permitted the organizations to remain in existence. Hyde went on to design the badge still worn by members of Delta Phi today, which includes a Maltese Cross, a symbol used by the Knights of Malta.

This connection to the Knights of Malta led Delta Phi to become known as "St. Elmo", a name first used by the Omicron chapter at Yale, which since has transformed into a senior secret society known as St. Elmo Society that is no longer associated with Delta Phi. Beginning at some point shortly after the Omicron chapter's inception in 1889, the brothers there used the name of St. Elmo, the patron saint of mariners and the Knights of Malta. On some campuses, Delta Phi chapters are known almost exclusively as "St. Elmo," "St. Elmo Hall," or simply "Elmo."

Expansion
In 1838, the Beta chapter of Delta Phi was founded at Brown University and Delta Phi finally became a “national” fraternity. Next, the Gamma chapter was established at New York University in 1841, followed quickly by the Delta chapter at Columbia University in 1842, the Epsilon chapter at Rutgers University and the Zeta chapter at Harvard University, both in 1845, and the Eta chapter at University of Pennsylvania in 1849. In 1844, Delta Phi held its first convention, only the second fraternity to have such a meeting and was held under the auspices of the Alpha chapter but was held in Troy, New York. The next convention was held in New York City and, seeing the growth in the organization, authorized the fraternity to undertake its first printed publication, a complete catalogue of the membership up to 1847.

Delta Phi left its base in the Northeast and expanded into what was then still the northwest of the young country, establishing the Iota chapter at University of Michigan in 1855 and southward to charter the Kappa chapter at the University of North Carolina that same year.

Delta Phi today

Delta Phi remains a small fraternity with ten active chapters and few chapters with more than a couple dozen members. It has resisted expansion in order to create an "intimate, personal experience" for its members. The fraternity's current expansion policy is to reactivate dormant chapters.  As a member of the Union Triad, Delta Phi is the third oldest fraternity and the oldest continuous fraternity in the United States.

Governance and organization
Owing mostly to its development in the early 19th century, Delta Phi organizes itself federally. Individual alumni chapters still exercise significant power over chapter governance. Those powers that are given in the national organization are vested in the Board of Governors. The board consists of one member appointed from each alumni chapter plus two undergraduate representatives elected at the annual leadership conference the fraternity sponsors. Among the duties given to the board is hiring the Executive Director who oversees day-to-day management of the fraternity.

In addition to the national governing organization of the fraternity, Delta Phi alumni have also established the Saint Elmo Foundation which, among other things, sponsors the annual leadership weekend and provides scholarships to undergraduate members of Delta Phi.

Alumni membership

Overall alumni participation among active chapters remains strong, with chapters hosting several social events throughout the year.

On or around November 17 of every year, the national organization sponsors the Founder's Day Dinner at the Saint Elmo Club where undergraduates and alumni celebrate the founding of the fraternity.

Founders
 Benjamin Burroughs, Presbyterian minister from Savannah, Georgia 
 William Hun Fondey, attorney from Albany, New York
 Samuel Lewis Lamberson, Presbyterian minister from Jamaica, New York
 Samuel C. Lawrison, United States Navy surgeon from Pensacola, Florida
 David Hervey Little, New York Supreme Court Justice from Rochester, New York
 John Mason, clergyman from Jamaica, New York
 Joseph Griffiths Masten, Mayor of Buffalo from Buffalo, New York
 Thomas Clark McLaury, clergyman from Lisbon, New York
 William Wilson, President of the College of Cincinnati from Ireland

Chapters
These are the chapters of Delta Phi. Active chapters noted in bold, inactive chapters noted in italics. Two chapters have withdrawn from affiliation with the national fraternity, but remain active on their campuses; their dates of withdrawal are noted.

Notes

Notable alumni

 John Jacob Astor IV - Ζ - industrialist and philanthropist
 Russell Wayne Baker - Ξ - Pulitzer Prize–winning writer; former host of PBS show Masterpiece Theatre
 Sullivan Ballou - Β - author of famous Civil War love letter at the First Battle of Bull Run
 John C. Bauerschmidt - Φ - Bishop of Middle Tennessee
 Marvin Bush - Ρ - George W. Bush's younger brother
 William P. Carey - H - founder of W. P. Carey & Co.; established the Carey Business School at Johns Hopkins University, the University of Maryland Francis King Carey School of Law, and the W. P. Carey School of Business at Arizona State University
 Howard Crosby - Γ - preacher; Chancellor of NYU
 Thomas B. Evans Jr. - P - US Congressman
 Edgar Fawcett (1847–1904) - Δ - novelist and poet
 The Harper Brothers - Δ - founders of Harper & Brothers publishing group
 Garret A. Hobart - E - Vice President of the United States under William McKinley
 Jay Jones (politician) - ΩΑ - Delegate for the 89th District of the Virginia House of Delegates
 George Low - Λ - NASA administrator and 14th President of Rensselaer Polytechnic Institute
 George C. Ludlow  - E - Governor of New Jersey
 George Macready - Β - actor
 Halsey Minor - Ρ - co-founder and former CEO of CNET Inc.
 Paolo Montalbán - E - actor of stage and screen
 John Pierpont Morgan Jr. - Ζ - financier; founder of JP Morgan Bank and Morgan Stanley
 Stanley Forman Reed - Ρ - Associate Justice of the Supreme Court of the United States
 Ned Rice - ΩΑ - General Manager of the Philadelphia Phillies
 Thomas Ridgway, U.S. Army officer and father of General Matthew Ridgway
 James Roosevelt - Ζ - General, congressman; son of Franklin D. Roosevelt
 George Santayana - Z - Spanish author and philosopher famous for noting that "those who cannot remember the past, are condemned to repeat it"
 Charles Scribner I - Θ - founder of Charles Scribner's Sons publishing group
 Maj. Gen. George Henry Sharpe - E - Civil War spymaster
 Wylie Tuttle - Δ - real estate developer responsible for the construction of the Tour Montparnasse in Paris
 Finn Wentworth N - businessman; COO and owner of New York Yankees; founder of YES Network; philanthropist
 George Will - Σ - Pulitzer Prize-winning conservative newspaper columnist, journalist, and author

References

External links
 
 History of Epsilon (Daily Targum, 10/2005)

 
Student organizations established in 1827
Student societies in the United States
North American Interfraternity Conference
Union College (New York)
1827 establishments in New York (state)